Emily McColl (born 1 November 1985) is an association football player who represented New Zealand at international level.

McColl made her Football Ferns début as a substitute in an 8–0 win over Solomon Islands on 11 April 2007 at the Oceania Olympic qualifying tournament held in Papua New Guinea, although was herself substituted later in the match after suffering heat stroke.

She represented New Zealand at the 2007 FIFA Women's World Cup finals in China, starting all three group matches  as they lost to Brazil 0–5, Denmark (0–2) and China (0–2).

McColl was also included in the New Zealand squad for the 2008 Summer Olympics making a substitute appearance in the 2–2 draw with Japan in their opening game.

References

External links
 

1985 births
Living people
New Zealand women's international footballers
New Zealand women's association footballers
Olympic association footballers of New Zealand
Footballers at the 2008 Summer Olympics
Sportspeople from Lower Hutt
Coastal Carolina Chanticleers women's soccer players
2007 FIFA Women's World Cup players
Women's association football midfielders
New Zealand expatriate women's association footballers
New Zealand expatriate sportspeople in the United States
Expatriate women's soccer players in the United States